The Tommy McGrane Memorial Cup is an annual pre-season invitational Scottish football tournament hosted by SJFA, West Region junior football club East Kilbride Thistle.

Tournament 
The trophy was named in honour of Tommy McGrane, who was one of the founders of East Kilbride Thistle. The tournament has always been at the Show Park, in the Village, East Kilbride, since it began in 2005. The tournament is played in a straight knockout format of two semi-finals and a final. The semi-final losers play in a third-fourth play-off match. The tournament used to regularly attract SFL clubs, with teams such as Clyde, Hamilton Academical and, in particular, Stirling Albion taking part in previous years.

Thistle only won their own tournament for the first time in 2009, at the fifth attempt of trying. The Tommy McGrane Cup trophy suffered severe damage in May 2012, after the club's trophy cabinet was smashed up, with various other items suffering damage, during a fire that broke out at Thistle's Social Club, which resided next to the stadium. A new trophy has since been made and presented to the winners of the tournament.

References 

Football in South Lanarkshire
Scottish football friendly trophies
Football cup competitions in Scotland
East Kilbride Thistle F.C.